TraXX FM is a 24/7 English-language radio station operated by Radio Televisyen Malaysia. Established on 1 April 2005, it was previously known as the English Language Service in 1946, the Blue Network in 1959 and Radio 4 in 1993.

The station's name "TraXX" (in use since 1 April 2005, as a part of re-branding of RTM's radio stations) is derived from the word 'Track' and 'XX', the later denoting the old tagline 'Xperience the Xcitement'. The station's initial tagline was 'Travel and Music' after re-branding to a tourism-oriented radio station. It then switched back to "Experience the Excitement" to suit its current role as an information-based and generalist radio station with a wide range of programmes and all kinds of music genres (K-Pop, English and Malay music).

Frequency

Radio

Television

Awards

Controversies
 January 1996: A listener from Penang called in during one of the station's shows to relate his recent experience with a member of the police force. At a roadblock, a policeman had stopped him for allegedly drinking and driving, and asked for a bribe from the listener. When he said that he did not have money with him, the policeman allegedly told him that he could call someone to bring him the money. When he said that he did not have a phone, the policeman allegedly offered him the use of his mobile phone. After the show, SAC Supian Amat lodged a police report against Patrick under the instruction of Rahim Noor, then the Inspector-General of Police (Malaysia), resulting in Patrick Teoh being called to the police station for interviews. The media went to town with this issue; famous local cartoonist Lat drew a satirical cartoon on the incident which was published in the New Straits Times.
 During a broadcast of 'Midnight Magic', broadcaster Teoh hosted a show in conjunction with the release of the American film Interview with a Vampire starring Tom Cruise, Brad Pitt, Antonio Banderas, Christian Slater and Kirsten Dunst. A listener claiming to be a vampire called in, wanting to dispel all myths associated with vampires. The show received very high listener ratings. The following day, RTM received multiple complaints from other listeners objecting to the 'promotion of myths', claiming that their children and elderly became traumatized from listening to the show. Teoh took a 2-week vacation to let the furore die down.

References

External links 
 

1950 establishments in Malaya
Radio stations in Malaysia
Radio Televisyen Malaysia